The 1957 Kategoria e Dytë was the 12th season of a second-tier association football league in Albania. The season started in March and ended in August. It's up to Puna Shkodër to win the 1957 championship and thus ensure promotion to the First  Division, overcoming the competition of Puna Berat to which even the play-off in three matches with Puna Kavajë, penultimate in the major series, will not be in favor. Due to the dissolution of Spartaku Tiranë, relegated from the first division, at the end of the 1957 season, the Puna Peshkopi, last classified, manages not to return immediately to the regional divisions.

League table

Promotion playoffs 
The second team of Kategoria e Dytë played in three matches promotion playoffs with the 7th of the National Championship (all in Tirana).

Notes

References

Kategoria e Parë seasons
Albania
2